The 1951 Pan American Games (the I Pan American Games) were held in Buenos Aires, Argentina between February 25 and March 9, 1951. The Pan American Games' origins were at the Games of the X Olympiad in Los Angeles, United States, where officials representing the National Olympic Committees of the Americas discussed the staging of an Olympic-style regional athletic competition for the athletes of the Americas.

During the Pan-American Exposition at Dallas in 1937, a limited sports program was staged. These included Athletics, Boxing, and Wrestling among others. This program was considered a success and a meeting of Olympic officials from the Americas was held.

At the Pan American Sports Conference held in 1940, it was decided to hold the 1st Pan American Games at Buenos Aires, Argentina, in 1942. The Pan American Sports Committee was formed to govern the games. Avery Brundage was elected as the first President. However, the Japanese attack on Pearl Harbor brought much of the Americas into World War II, thus forcing the cancellation of the 1942 games.

A second conference was held in 1948. Avery Brundage was re-elected as the President of the PASC. It was decided that Buenos Aires would still host the 1st Pan American Games, this time in 1951.

Venues 

 River Plate Stadium - Athletics
 Luna Park Stadium - Basketball and Boxing
 Racing Club Stadium - Football
 Club Universitario de Buenos Aires - Diving, Swimming and Waterpolo
 Pista Nacional de Remo, Tigre - Rowing
 Velódromo Municipal - Cycling
 Campo de Mayo - Pan American Village

Opening ceremony 
The opening ceremony took place at the Racing Club Stadium, which had been recently inaugurated. The Greek athlete Aristeidis Roubanis lit the pebble for the first time, while local athlete Delfo Cabrera was the bearer of the Argentine flag. 

The inauguration event was attended by the Argentine President Juan Perón and the member of the Pan-American Games Commission, Avery Brundage.

Medal count

Sports

References

External links

 Buenos Aires 1951 - I Pan American Games - Official Report at PanamSports.org